Settefrati is a comune (municipality) in the Province of Frosinone in the Italian region Lazio, located about  east of Rome and about  east of Frosinone.

Main sights
The territory of Settefrati houses the ancient Sanctuary of Canneto; near to it, in 1958, remains of  an ancient temple dedicated to the Italic goddess Mefitis was found (c. 3rd century BC).

In 1974 less than a kilometre from the town centre, at Casa Firma, remains of a Roman villa dating to the late Imperial era were found.

Of the 10th-century castle a tower and some ruins remain.

External links
Official website

References

Cities and towns in Lazio
Castles in Italy
Roman villas in Italy